Rubén Miño Peralta (born 18 January 1989) is a Spanish professional footballer who plays as a goalkeeper.

Club career
Born in Cornellà de Llobregat, Barcelona, Catalonia, Miño moved to FC Barcelona's youth system, La Masia, at the age of 11. Four years later, he served a two-season loan at local UE Cornellà in the regional leagues.

In 2008, Miño returned as starter of Barça's reserves, as they had just returned to the Segunda División B under young manager Pep Guardiola. He made his official debut against SCR Santa Eulàlia on 31 August of that year (1–0 away loss).

On 13 August 2010, due to an injury to José Manuel Pinto and the need to rest Víctor Valdés, Miño was included in the nineteen-man Barcelona squad to face Sevilla FC in the Supercopa de España; on 14 August, he played the full 90 minutes in a 3–1 away defeat.

Miño totalled 25 Segunda División games over two full seasons with the B's. On 5 July 2012, he left Barcelona and signed for fellow La Liga club RCD Mallorca. He made his debut in the competition on 18 January 2013, featuring 30 minutes in the 3–2 loss at RCD Espanyol after coming on as a substitute for the injured Dudu Aouate.

On 2 July 2015, after featuring only six times during the campaign, Miño signed a one-year contract with Real Oviedo, newly promoted to the second division. On 4 December 2017, after one year in the Cypriot First Division with AEK Larnaca FC, he joined Spanish second-tier team Albacete Balompié until the following 30 June.

In January 2019, free agent Miño moved to FC Politehnica Iași of the Romanian Liga I. He returned to his homeland shortly after, agreeing to a deal at UD Logroñés. With the latter side, as the 2019–20 season was curtailed due to the COVID-19 pandemic, he achieved a first-ever promotion to division two, notably earning player of the match accolades in the 3–2 penalty shoot-out victory over CD Castellón in the play-offs.

Miño signed for CF Talavera de la Reina of the Primera División RFEF in August 2021.

International career
On 6 February 2009, Miño received his first call-up for the Spain under-21 team. The first of his two caps arrived on 27 March of that year, in a 2–1 friendly defeat to the Republic of Ireland.

Career statistics

Honours
Barcelona
FIFA Club World Cup: 2009
Supercopa de España: 2010

Spain U21
UEFA European Under-21 Championship: 2011

References

External links

1989 births
Living people
People from Cornellà de Llobregat
Sportspeople from the Province of Barcelona
Spanish footballers
Footballers from Catalonia
Association football goalkeepers
La Liga players
Segunda División players
Segunda División B players
Primera Federación players
UE Cornellà players
FC Barcelona Atlètic players
FC Barcelona players
RCD Mallorca players
Real Oviedo players
Albacete Balompié players
UD Logroñés players
CF Talavera de la Reina players
Cypriot First Division players
AEK Larnaca FC players
Liga I players
FC Politehnica Iași (2010) players
Spain under-21 international footballers
Spanish expatriate footballers
Expatriate footballers in Cyprus
Expatriate footballers in Romania
Spanish expatriate sportspeople in Cyprus
Spanish expatriate sportspeople in Romania